Allaikhovsky District (Allayıaxa uluuha) is an administrative and municipal district (raion, or ulus), one of the thirty-four in the Sakha Republic, Russia. It is located in the northeast of the republic towards the mouth of the Indigirka River and borders with the East Siberian Sea in the north, Nizhnekolymsky District in the east, Srednekolymsky District in the southeast, Abyysky District in the south, and with Ust-Yansky District in the west. Its administrative center is the urban locality (an urban-type settlement) of Chokurdakh. As of the 2010 Census, the total population of the district was 3,050, with the population of Chokurdakh accounting for 77.6% of that number.

Geography
It is located north of the Arctic Circle, in the lower reaches of the Indigirka River. Most of the district is part of the Yana-Indigirka Lowland and Kolyma Lowland. The Polousny Range and the Ulakhan-Sis are located to the south and the Kondakov Highland rises to the east.
The Indigirka and its numerous tributaries, such as the Bolshaya Ercha and the Allaikha River, as well as the Khroma —with the Uryung-Ulakh, the Kyuyol-Yuryakh, Bogdashkina and Gusinaya in the far northern end, flow through the district. Lake Soluntakh is one of the largest in the district.

History
The district was established on May 20, 1931.

Administrative and municipal status
Within the framework of administrative divisions, Allaikhovsky District is one of the thirty-four in the republic. It is divided into one settlement (an administrative division with the administrative center in the urban-type settlement (inhabited locality) of Chokurdakh) and five rural okrugs (naslegs), all of which comprise six rural localities. As a municipal division, the district is incorporated as Allaikhovsky Municipal District. The Settlement of Chokurdakh is incorporated into an urban settlement, four rural okrugs are incorporated into four rural settlements within the municipal district, and the territory of the fifth rural okrug is managed by the municipal district as inter-settlement territory. The urban-type settlement of Chokurdakh serves as the administrative center of both the administrative and municipal district.

Inhabited localities

Economy
The main forms of business are reindeer husbandry, fishing, and fur trade. There are deposits of tin and gold in the district.

Demographics
As of the 2010 Census, the ethnic composition was as follows:
Yakuts: 39.1%
Russians: 31.8%
Evens: 20.1%
Yukaghir people: 2.6%
Ukrainians: 1.7%
Evenks: 1.2%
Buryats: 0.9%
Chukchi: 0.6%
others: 2.2%

Climate

References

Notes

Sources
Official website of the Sakha Republic. Registry of the Administrative-Territorial Divisions of the Sakha Republic. Allaikhovsky District.

External links
Map of Allaikhovsky District

Districts of the Sakha Republic
States and territories established in 1931
1931 establishments in the Soviet Union